The Social Democratic Party of China was a political party, organized by Chinese immigrants in Europe. Wang Kien was elected secretary of the party at an extraordinary party congress November 14, 1926. Yang Kantao, resident of Paris, also served as secretary of the party for a period. In the mid-1920s, the party was affiliated to the Labour and Socialist International.

References

Defunct political parties in China
Members of the Labour and Socialist International
Political parties in the Republic of China
Social democratic parties
Socialist parties in China